The Sigma 70-300mm F4-5.6 APO DG Macro lens is a consumer-level, telephoto zoom lens made by Sigma Corporation.
Different versions of this lens are produced that work with cameras from Canon, Nikon, Pentax, Konica Minolta, Sony and Sigma.  Additionally, Olympus' 70–300 f/4–5.6 lens for Four-Thirds has the same optical design and specifications as this lens. The lens is packaged with a lens hood.

Sigma's APO designation signifies an apochromatic lens that uses low dispersion glass to minimize chromatic aberration. The APO version has a red ring on the end of the lens body to distinguish it from the non-APO version of the lens, the Sigma 70-300mm F4-5.6 DG Macro.

This lens has 14 elements in 10 groups including two special low dispersion glass elements in the front lens group, and one in the rear lens group. The non-APO version has only one such element in the rear.

An additional feature to this lens is a macro option between 200–300mm. The minimum focusing distance between 200 and 300mm is 95 cm (37.4 inches). It is enabled by a manual switch and provides a maximum magnification of 1:2.

References

070-300